Geophis dubius, also known as the Mesa del Sur earth snake, is a snake of the colubrid family. It is endemic to Mexico. This species is endemic to the state of Oaxaca in Mexico. It is found between 2,100 and 2,650 m of altitude.

References

Geophis
Snakes of North America
Endemic reptiles of Mexico
Taxa named by Wilhelm Peters
Reptiles described in 1861